Blood Test is a 1923 American silent Western film directed by Don Marquis and starring Dick Hatton, Nelson McDowell and Lafe McKee.

Cast
 Dick Hatton
 Nelson McDowell
 William F. Moran
 Lafe McKee
 Florence Lee
 Billie Bennett
 Les Bates
 Frank Rice

References

External links
 

1923 films
1923 Western (genre) films
American black-and-white films
Silent American Western (genre) films
1920s English-language films
1920s American films